This is a list of monuments in Mustang District, Nepal as officially recognized by and available through the Department of Archaeology, Nepal.
Mustang is a district of Gandaki Province and is located in central northern Nepal.

List of monuments

|}

See also
List of monuments in Nepal
List of monuments in Gandaki Province

References

External links

Mustang